Happy Couples Never Last was an American independent record label founded in Indianapolis, Indiana in 1998 by Clark Giles.

According to Giles, the label started when he saved up money to take his girlfriend on a trip, however they broke up and Giles ended up using the money to help his friends release music.

The label produced over 40 recordings, and is seen as an important figure during the second-wave screamo scene during the late 1990s and early 2000s, releasing early recordings by Usurp Synapse, Love Lost But Not Forgotten, and Pg. 99, as well as releasing the compilation album Relics of Ordinary Life, which included contributions by various screamo acts. Other notable acts that released recordings through the label include The Plot to Blow Up the Eiffel Tower and Racebannon. The label is inactive, their latest release being issued in 2006.

Label roster

About the Fire
Advocate
Angelville
Anodyne
Arma Angelus
Better Off Dead
Breather Resist
Creation's End
Eclipse of Eden
Emotion Zero
Find Him and Kill Him
Freedom for Saturn
Harkonen
Ice Nine
Lefty's Deceiver
Love Lost But Not Forgotten
Majhas
Mara'akate
Pg. 99
Phoenix Bodies
Premonitions of War
Racebannon
Shakespace
Tamora
The Drago Miette
The Dream Is Dead
The Dropscience
The Plot to Blow Up the Eiffel Tower
The Warmth
Three in the Attic
Usurp Synapse
Vinyl Star
Wasteland D.C.

References

External links
Webpage (Archived)
Discogs page

American independent record labels